Sweden participated at the 2010 Summer Youth Olympics in Singapore. The nation won a total of five medals, including two gold medals.

Medalists

Athletics

Boys
Field Events

Girls
Field Events

Badminton

Boys

Gymnastics

Artistic Gymnastics

Girls

Rowing

Swimming

Table tennis

Individual

Team

Taekwondo

Triathlon

Girls

Mixed

References

External links
Competitors List: Sweden

Summer Youth Olympics
Nations at the 2010 Summer Youth Olympics
Sweden at the Youth Olympics